"Brutality, Religion and a Dance Beat" is a 7" split single of two songs. It contains the songs "Big in Japan", by eponymous band Big in Japan, and "Do the Chud", by The Chuddy Nuddies (later Yachts), both groups formed in the 1970s punk scene of Liverpool. It was released by the Eric's label in November 1977.

The side-A song, "Big in Japan", is an eponymous song of the band Big in Japan. It is a power pop/punk oriented song, in which the singer, Jayne Casey, sings only the song's title, plus a chorus. The band comprised future and past successful musicians Jayne Casey, guitarists Bill Drummond (later with The KLF), Ian Broudie (later of Care and The Lightning Seeds) and Clive Langer (of Deaf School), bassist Kev Ward and drummer Phil Allen.

The side-B song is "Do the Chud" by The Chuddy Nuddies, which later changed their name to Yachts. The song is synthpop oriented.

Track listing

Personnel

Big in Japan
 Jayne Casey – lead vocals
 Bill Drummond– guitar
 Ian Broudie – guitar
 Clive Langer – guitar
 Kev Ward – bass
 Phil Allen – drums

The Chuddy Nuddies
Bob Bellis
Henry Priestman
Martin Dempsey
Martin Watson

References

External links
 Big in Japan tapes

1977 debut singles
Big in Japan (band)
Split singles
British new wave songs